The 2019 IHF Inter-Continental Trophy was the fourth edition of the competition held in Pristina, Kosovo from 10 to 14 April 2019. It featured a men's youth (U-19) tournament and a men's junior (U-21) tournament.

Junior tournament

Qualified teams

Preliminary round

Group A

Group B

Knockout round

Bracket

Semifinals

Fifth place game

Third place game

Final

Final ranking

Youth tournament

Qualified teams

Preliminary round

Group A

Group B

Knockout round

Bracket

Semifinals

Fifth place game

Third place game

Final

Final ranking

References

External links

IHF Inter-Continental Trophy
IHF Inter-Continental Trophy
Sports competitions in Kosovo
IHF Inter-Continental Trophy
IHF Inter-Continental Trophy